The A3 road is a long road in Kenya extending from Thika to the Somali border.

The road is paved all the way to Modika, where it then is unpaved for the remainder of the way to the Somali border.

Towns  

The following towns, listed from west to east, are located along the highway.

Thika (intersection with A2 road)
Mwingi
Garissa
Dadaab
Liboi (the last town before the Somalian border)

References 

Roads in Kenya